Tom Baldwin is a British journalist, author and former Labour Party senior adviser. He has worked as a journalist for a number of national titles including The Times and The Sunday Telegraph. He was also a senior political adviser to Ed Miliband and director of communications & strategy at the Labour Party. He has written a book, Ctrl Alt Delete, about technology's "abusive relationship with truth in media and politics" over the past 30 years. He was communications director at the People's Vote campaign.

Baldwin was educated at Lord Williams comprehensive school in Thame and Balliol College, Oxford where he studied Politics, Philosophy and Economics.

He started his career in journalism at the Newbury Weekly News before moving to The News, Portsmouth and then The Sunday Telegraph where he became political editor. Later, at The Times he worked as deputy political editor, Washington bureau chief, chief reporter and assistant editor.  He was responsible for breaking the scandal of Bernie Ecclestone's secret donation to the Labour Party and was injuncted by the Home Office when he leaked the report of the Macpherson report into the murder of Stephen Lawrence.  However, he was generally regarded as pro-Labour and, in his book, acknowledges his own role in the media's degeneration over recent years.

In 2010, he was appointed as head of communications for the Labour Party and also worked as Senior Adviser to Ed Miliband. He ended this role in after Labour's defeat in the 2015 general election. He later worked as director of communications at the People's Vote campaign which called for a new referendum on Brexit. In October 2019, he was controversially sacked along with the campaign's director, James McGrory, by Roland Rudd, the chair of one of the groups in the People's Vote alliance, just days after organising a million-strong march through London. More than 40 members of staff walked out in protest at the sackings and Baldwin attacked Rudd for putting a "wrecking ball" through the campaign at a crucial moment in politics. Rudd was later forced to step down from his role.

Works

References

Further reading
Financial times opinion piece by Tom Baldwin
Tom Baldwin archive at The Guardian

External links
Labor list

British political journalists
Year of birth missing (living people)
Living people